Rufus Does Judy at Capitol Studios is a live album by Rufus Wainwright released by BMG on June 10, 2022. The album was recorded at Capitol Studios, during a virtual concert of the same name, which saw Wainwright re-create Judy Garland's live album Judy at Carnegie Hall. The filmed performance premiered on Veeps on June 10, 2021, which would have been Garland's 99th birthday. The concert featured an in-studio duet with Kristin Chenoweth and a virtual duet with Martha Wainwright.

Previously, Wainwright performed the set at Carnegie Hall in 2006, which was released as the live album Rufus Does Judy at Carnegie Hall (2007). He also released the DVD Rufus! Rufus! Rufus! Does Judy! Judy! Judy!: Live from the London Palladium, featuring live recordings from his 2007 show at London Palladium, and performed the set again at Carnegie Hall in 2016.

Description

Wainwright was backed by a four-piece band. Renée Zellweger was the only live audience member.

Promotion
The concert was promoted with the release of "Over the Rainbow" and a limited edition T-shirt created in collaboration with Michael Kors.

Wainwright performed "Come Rain or Come Shine" on The Late Late Show with James Corden.

References

2021 concerts
2022 live albums
Albums recorded at Capitol Studios
June 2021 events in the United States
Rufus Wainwright albums